Gonimbrasia tyrrhea, the zigzag emperor moth, is a moth of the family Saturniidae. The species was first described by Pieter Cramer in 1776. It is found in central and southern Africa.

The wingspan is 90–120 mm. Adults are greenish grey with a white zigzag line.

The larvae feed on Acacia mollissima, Malus, Fagus, Salix and Laburnum species. They do not spin silk but produce a subterranean pupae. They are matt black with greyish-blue scales and reach a length of up to 100 mm.

References

Moths described in 1776
Saturniinae
Moths of Africa
Taxa named by Pieter Cramer